Mukomuko is a town, district and the regency seat of Mukomuko Regency in Bengkulu province, Indonesia. Its population is 15,005.

Climate
Mukomuko has a tropical rainforest climate (Af) with heavy to very heavy rainfall year-round.

References

Regency seats of Bengkulu